Sanjay Amar (born 18 February 1979 in village Pallan of district Kathua of J&K state) is an Indian film director, actor, writer and producer. In 2012, he made his directorial debut with the film "Future to Bright Hai Ji". However, he turned producer in the same year with the film Identity Card.

Career
After completing his bachelor's degree from Jammu University,[2] Amar started his career in television production. He wrote, directed and produced his first television documentary series for Doordarshan Srinagar in 2004 followed by his first fiction telefilm for Doordarshan Jammu in Dogri language as writer, director and producer in the next year, then after he started making commercial short films, documentaries for Doordarshan & J&K Govt. and ad films eventually shifting base to Mumbai in 2007. He has been the founder of Amar Chand Motion Pictures under which he has been producing the content oriented films.

Film director- producer
In 2012,  Sanjay Amar made his feature film directorial debut with Future to bright hai ji, a film that was released on 2 November 2012. The film deals with an attention-grabbing narrative plot involving a couple who have aspirations to fly sky high, but are struck with misfortunes of the lower-middle class existence which stars Aamir Bashir, Sonal Sehgal, Satish Kaushik, Asrani and many others. Amar turned producer with the film called " Identity Card.. ek lifeline" which he wrote also and produced it. The film got released on 29 August 2014. He is producer-writer for another film entitled " Ek Sarkari Joota" which is currently under post-production The title of the film has been changed to " Rabbi" due to some creative reasons. In December 2013, Amar  went on floor for his third feature film as producer and writer but unfortunately the first schedule got scrapped and later in August 2014, Sanjay Amar re-shot the complete film taking the reins of direction in his hands. The film is called " 19th January" which  talks about the Kashmiri pundit exodus from Kashmir.

Filmography

Films

References

1979 births
Living people
Film directors from Jammu and Kashmir